Parker Adair "P. A." Henderson (January 7, 1875 – July 25, 1925) was the seventh and eleventh Mayor of Miami. He was born in Hampton, Henry County, Georgia where his father owned a series of successful Saw Mills. Parker was 16 when his father first in-trusted him to running one of his saw mills which he ran for 15 years. Parker moved to Miami, Florida in 1906 where he organized the McCrimmon Lumber Company with his ther-in-law C.T. McCrimmon. In 1912, Parker purchased his brother-in-law's interest in the company, renaming it P.A. Henderson Lumber Company. Parker was elected Mayor of Miami in June, 1915 taking office the following November. He was elected again in 1923.

References

1875 births
Mayors of Miami
1925 deaths
People from Hampton, Georgia